The 2004 USA Sevens was the first time that the USA Sevens rugby tournament was played. It was held at the Home Depot Center in the Los Angeles suburb of Carson. Argentina defeated New Zealand 21–12 in the cup final to win the tournament. It was Argentina's first victory in a World Series tournament since its inception five years before.

Format
The teams were drawn into four pools of four teams each, with each team playing every other team in their pool once. The top two teams from each pool advanced to the Cup/Plate brackets. The bottom two teams from each group went to the Bowl/Shield brackets.

Pool Stage

Pool A

Pool B

Pool C

Pool D

Knockout rounds

Cup

Plate

Bowl

Shield

References

USA Sevens
USA
2004 in American rugby union
2004 rugby sevens competitions